The 2011 Moselle Open was a men's tennis tournament played on indoor hard courts. It was the ninth edition of the Moselle Open, and was part of the ATP World Tour 250 Series of the 2011 ATP World Tour. It was held at the Parc des Expositions de Metz Métropole in Metz, France, from 17 September until 23 September 2011. Jo-Wilfried Tsonga won the singles title.

Entrants

Seeds
{|class="sortable wikitable"
|-
! width="70"| Country
! width="175"| Player
! Rank1 
! Seed
|-
|
|Jo-Wilfried Tsonga
|10
|1
|-
|
|Richard Gasquet
|15
|2
|-
|
|Alexandr Dolgopolov
|20
|3
|-
|
|Ivan Ljubičić
|29
|4
|-
|
|Michaël Llodra
|33
|6
|-
|
|Xavier Malisse
|46
|6
|-
|
|Philipp Kohlschreiber
|48
|7
|-
|
|Gilles Müller
|49
|8
|}
 1 Rankings are as of 12 September 2011.

Other entrants
The following players received wildcards into the singles main draw:
  Arnaud Clément
  Benoît Paire
  Kenny de Schepper

The following players received entry from the qualifying draw:

  Jonathan Dasnières de Veigy
  Nicolas Renavand
  Mathieu Rodrigues
  Igor Sijsling

Finals

Singles

 Jo-Wilfried Tsonga defeated  Ivan Ljubičić, 6–3, 6–7(4–7), 6–3
It was Tsonga's first title of the year, his first in two years and the sixth of his career.

Doubles

 Jamie Murray /  André Sá defeated  Lukáš Dlouhý /  Marcelo Melo, 6–4, 7–6(7)

References

External links
 Official website